Broad Oak and Thornhill Meadows is a Site of Special Scientific Interest near the village of Cross Hands in Carmarthen & Dinefwr,  Wales.

The site comprises grassland, formerly used as pasture for horses and cattle. It is a stronghold of the marsh fritillary butterfly.

References

See also
List of Sites of Special Scientific Interest in Carmarthen & Dinefwr

Sites of Special Scientific Interest in Carmarthen & Dinefwr
Meadows in Wales